Oligodon melaneus  (common name: bluebelly kukri snake is a species of snake in the family Colubridae. It is endemic to eastern India. It was described in 1909 by Frank Wall based on two specimens from Tindharia, Darjeeling.

Description
One the types is a female,  in total length, with the tail being . It was gravid with four eggs. The other type is a male, similar in length to the female. The body is uniformly black above, grading to grayish in the flanks. The belly is blue-grey, with black speckling in the female.

References

melaneus
Reptiles of India
Endemic fauna of India
Taxa named by Frank Wall
Reptiles described in 1909